Batman Beyond is a comic book series featuring the fictional character Terry McGinnis as Batman and based on the animated television series of the same name. It has appeared in various DC Comics publications, including a six-issue miniseries from 1999, a 24-issue series running from 1999 to 2001, the "Hush" arc by DC Comics in 2010, and an eight-issue miniseries in 2011. A short-running series titled Batman Beyond Unlimited was later released, followed by Batman Beyond 2.0 in 2013.

Batman Beyond and Batman Beyond (vol. 2) DCAU tie-ins (1999–2001)

After an initial six-issue miniseries released in March 1999, Batman Beyond had its own comic book series, running through November 1999 until October 2001, for a total of 24 issues. They were set in the same world as the TV series and aimed at younger readers.

Originally, Batman Beyond #3 (the monthly series) was to focus on the Terrific Trio from the episode "Heroes". The story would have 2-D Man and Magma trying to revive their former teammate, Freon. It was rejected due to their resemblance to the Fantastic Four.

Terry also appeared in Superman Adventures #64. The story has Terry/Batman traveling to the present and teaming up with Superman against a futuristic version of Brainiac.

A comic book adaptation of Batman Beyond: Return of the Joker was released in 2001.

The series had issues reprinted in Batman Beyond and DC Comics Presents Batman Beyond #1.

DC Universe

Cameos
In Superman/Batman #22 (written by Jeph Loeb), a Batman wearing the Beyond costume appears, making his first foray into the regular DC Comics continuity. The plot involves Bizarro being transported to an alternate version of Gotham City. In issue #23, this Batman is named "Tim". The packaging for the action figure created by DC Direct based on this appearance in Superman/Batman identifies this Batman Beyond as Tim Drake.

On March 3, 2007, Dan DiDio announced that Terry McGinnis may be showing up in the DCU sometime that year.  Terry appeared in Countdown to Final Crisis #21,  Earth-12.

A Green Lantern implied to be from Earth-12, a universe within the multiverse similar to that of Batman Beyond (though not the same GL represented in the animated series) was a participant in the Countdown: Arena series (2007) leading towards Final Crisis.

The character also made a cameo in Justice League of America #43, which was released May 2010.

Mainstream contemporary continuity
In Batman #700 (June 2010), Terry McGinnis is included in the one-off as a part of the DC Universe presented, having a history with Damian Wayne, who rescued him as Batman from Two-Face-Two when he was held hostage as an infant. Two-Face-Two believed Terry McGinnis was one of a pair of twin boys who were the sons of billionaires rather than Warren and Mary McGinnis. Two-Face-Two transformed Terry into a miniature duplicate of the Joker with Joker venom. Damian administers the antidote after he rescues Terry. In the following page, a teenage McGinnis is seen behind the Batman cowl, battling the apparently-resurrected Joker, with Damian as his mentor, instead of Bruce.

Superman/Batman Annual #4 (2010) is a single oversized issue featuring Terry McGinnis' Batman. Author Paul Levitz penned the story, with experience collaborating with Paul Dini and Alan Burnett in the past. It picks up after Superman's first meeting with the new Batman taking place in the DCAU, and supposedly jibing with the DCU's "Batman Beyond" verse.

In September 2011, The New 52 rebooted DC's continuity. In this new timeline, Terry is reintroduced in the 2014 maxiseries, The New 52: Futures End.

Batman Beyond (vol. 3) (2010)
Batman Beyond is a 2010 six-issue comic book limited series published by DC Comics. The series is an attempt to mesh the DC animated universe television series Batman Beyond with the mainstream DC continuity. The comic series is penned by Emmy Award-nominated writer Adam Beechen with art by Ryan Benjamin. Beechen stated his comic book arc would open the door for the "legendary" DCAU to enter into the mainstream DC Universe (comics), tying into both continuities. The story features Terry McGinnis, the future Batman, now a seasoned hero, and his mentor Bruce Wayne, the former Batman, dealing with their straining relationship over the demands of the role of Batman, as a new killer emerges with ties to the original Dark Knight's past.

Creation and development
Beechen was approached by Dan DiDio in December 2008 regarding the possibility of the project. Beechen responded by pitching DC Comics editor Ian Sattler in a two-worded email, the title to opening story arc. The series was green-lit during Comic-Con 2009. The series was first announced during the Emerald City ComiCon in March 2010. Summarizing the series, Beechen stated:

The story arc opened in a single issue focusing on and featuring Terry McGinnis and Superman in Superman/Batman Annual #4. Following the issue, the miniseries began in June 2010, under the title Future Evil. In August 2010, the series was announced to continue following the completion of the first story arc as an ongoing series.

Plot

At Project Cadmus, an inmate escapes from the Neo-Gotham based facility. During the escape, he notices that a fight is occurring above him and, upon realizing that it is Batman, expresses his disgust that someone new has taken on the mantle of the Bat. After the new Dark Knight, Terry McGinnis, successfully captures Spellbinder, Justice League Unlimited member Micron arrives and attempts to recruit Terry to the League. This is not the first time someone has tried to recruit him, and McGinnis remains resolute in his refusal to accept the League's offer. When Terry returns to the Bat Cave and mentions that a member of the League tried to recruit him again, Bruce Wayne, Terry's mentor, immediately replies to "tell them no".

The death of a minor costumed criminal, Signalman prompts Bruce to send Terry out to investigate. They discover that the M.O. matches Two-Face, who had disappeared years ago during his final battle with Bruce. Reports of alarms at St. James Hospital disrupts them and Terry investigates, it has been the home of the Mad Hatter since Arkham Asylum closed down. After checking in on the Hatter, who has become docile and somewhat senile, Terry discovers a nurse under attack by a man in a trench coat. The mysterious rogue flees at the sight of Batman and Terry checks on the nurse, who says the man told her to "Hush".

This leads on a hunt for Hush, with Bruce explaining what took place during his last confrontation with Hush. During a fight with him, Hush dived through a window and was shot by the homeowner. Bruce then fled without inspecting the body, but was satisfied with the report that it was Thomas Elliot, for a while. Bruce admits Hush's skill for strategy and plastic surgery meant that Thomas could have planned the entire scenario. After a brief encounter and chase with a new Catwoman, Terry discovers that another villain has been killed, this time with the use of the Penguin's classic trick umbrellas. Attempting to stay ahead of their foe, Terry and Bruce search out the Calendar Man, Julian Gregory Day; upon confronting Day, Terry is suddenly ambushed by "Hush".

During Terry's fight with "Hush," it is revealed that he is not only capable of matching Terry, but is also aware it is not Bruce Wayne. "Hush" reveals his plan  while regarding Terry as an 'imposter', and states he will 'orphan' Batman all over again by killing Batman's rogues gallery. "Hush" escapes, leaving Terry to decide whether or not to pursue him or rescue Calendar Man, who is bound with a bomb attached to him. Choosing the latter, Terry arrives too late as a bomb detonates, killing Day. After he returns to the cave, Terry receives a talk from Bruce about commitment to Batman. Meanwhile, Amanda Waller talks with Doctor Reid about reports of the murders; Reid insists that they report their role in this, but Waller shoots down the option.

Terry returns home and lives a normal life for the day, meeting up with his girlfriend, Dana. Unhappy about their lack of time together, she asks whether anything long term will ever come out of his working for Wayne. Terry soon after returns to the cave and confronts Bruce but finds no one around and investigates Bruce's secret new "gadgets". The "gadgets" turn out to be Bat-Wraiths, robotic drones created to help assist Terry in his duties. Terry decides that he will prove himself to Bruce, without the drones and sets out to capture "Hush" once and for all. Terry's first lead is to check on Tim Drake, confirming that Tim has been under constant physical and psychological observation since his time as the Joker. Terry then proceeds to confront and question Dick Grayson. We see "Hush" hired the new Catwoman to plant a tracking device on Batman so that he can monitor his whereabouts, before proceeding to betray and strangle her to death as part of his 'vendetta'.

Using a Bat-Wraith, Bruce attempts to apprehend Hush, allowing Catwoman an opportunity to escape. The attack fails as Hush attempts to hack the Drone, forcing Bruce to activate the Wraith's self-destruct. Meanwhile, Terry talks with Dick Grayson, who now runs an athletics training center. Dick explains that he retired as Nightwing after he was shot, resulting in losing an eye while aiding Batman. He then retired in disgust at Bruce's lack of concern for Dick's health after the shooting. As Terry leaves, Dick warns Terry but Terry disregards it. At Cadmus, Waller learns that Doctor Reid has gone missing. Attempting to lure Hush into a trap, Terry uses a hologram to pose as a villain, only to be hit by Hush using Shriek's Tech. Mocking Terry, Hush unmasks himself and reveals himself to be Dick Grayson, determined to replace Bruce Wayne once and for all.

In an alley, Reid is preparing to provide information to Commissioner Barbara Gordon regarding Hush's origin and motives. However, she is being pursued by Cadmus' security, under Waller's orders, but Reid manages to escape. Dick Grayson arrives and saves the doctor, however Reid is terrified and faints after seeing Grayson's face. Elsewhere, the other Dick savors the moment over an incapacitated Terry, and spares him so that he can witness his plan. Catwoman arrives after the second Grayson departs, and saves Terry's life from his wounds. Bruce deduces Catwoman's true identity as the daughter of supervillain Multiplex. In the Batcave, all of the Bat-Wraiths have been activated and controlled by Hush after developing his own remote, sparing Bruce as the drones leave. At Cadmus, more inmates have escaped, including Killer Croc, and Waller deduces that Hush must have done it.

At Gotham Central, Reid reveals that Hush is a clone of Grayson created by Cadmus, due to Waller insisting that "the world must always have a Batman." Waller believed that Bruce's psyche was too unstable, and Grayson was seemingly the next best candidate, as he shares Bruce's passion, as well as other factors. However, the clone escaped before he was ready, believing himself to be the real Dick Grayson and wanting to replace Batman as Gotham's champion. Reid also reveals that she is a granddaughter of Thomas Elliot, and is seeking to atone for her family's sins by working for Waller. In the Batcave, Bruce begins treating Terry's wounds, he monologues that he has been making faults in Terry's actions where none existed. Terry had regained consciousness during his monologue, to which Bruce confirms to Terry that everything he heard is true. Hush reveals by transmission that he, inspired by Gotham's last earthquake, will save the city by performing mercy killings of its corrupt, by a mass of explosives at the epicenter to set off another quake.

The wounded Terry, aided by Dick Grayson and Catwoman, confronts the clone, with Grayson unable to convince Hush that he is merely a clone. The group defeats Hush when Bruce temporarily overrides Hush's control of the Bat-Wraiths, resulting in the clone being accidentally impaled on a Bat-Wraith. Catwoman departs quickly and Grayson departs despite Bruce's attempts to offer an apology for how things ended between them. Terry returns to Bruce where they discuss the ideals of heroism. Bruce offers Terry a chance to step down as Batman, Terry refuses, stating that it is better than anything else he could do. Unknown to them, Waller has escaped blame for her role in Grayson's cloning by claiming that Reid was acting alone, and is now aided by a new geneticist, Doctor Thawne. Waller has begun research into a new line of clones, stating that recent events have merely confirmed her belief that the world will always need a Batman.

Reception
The first issue of the series was well received and met favorable reviews for both writing and art. Ian Robinson of Crave noted the series was both blended well with and matured from the animated series. Jesse Schedeen of IGN provided a favorable review, but commented that while the writing transitioned well from small screen to comic, the art was 'haphazard' and 'inconsistent.'

Batman Beyond (vol. 4) (2011)
Batman Beyond was published as an ongoing series that lasted for eight issues. It featured two major storylines, the first of which featured the Justice League Beyond and a person who would become the Matter Master of the future. The second storyline featured the return of Blight, Terry's original nemesis. Two issues also provided an in-depth exploration of characters Max Gibson and Inque, whose origins were revealed. Several plot threads were not resolved and left for the 2012 relaunch. Also in 2011, a comic book one-shot titled Superman Beyond #0 was released, set in the "Beyond" timeline and featured a cameo of Terry McGinnis.

Batman Beyond Unlimited and Batman Beyond Universe digital comics (2012–2015)

The Batman Beyond universe returned as tri-weekly digital issues, which were published on a monthly basis in print as the Batman Beyond Unlimited ongoing 48-page comic book. This monthly title included Batman Beyond, Justice League Beyond and Superman Beyond.

Superman Beyond ceased publication with its 20th digital release, in June 2013. Justice League Beyond then ceased publication with its 25th digital issue, in June 2013. Batman Beyond eventually ceased publication with its 29th digital issue, in July 2013.

After the cancellation of Batman Beyond Unlimited, the Batman Beyond line was relaunched. Starting in August 2013, Batman Beyond 2.0 and Justice League Beyond 2.0 began publication, with each digital title receiving new creative teams. The print release was relaunched as Batman Beyond Universe, The new series takes place a year after Batman Beyond Unlimited. Terry is now a freshman at Gotham University and now has more experience as Batman. One of his classmates is Melanie Walker. Terry is no longer working with Bruce; instead it is Dick Grayson sitting at the computer. The Justice League also must deal with Superman when his powers go out of control and an old foe from his past also returns. After the final story arc, 'Justice Lords Beyond', the series concluded in 2014.

Plot

10,000 Clowns (Prelude)
Bruce and Barbara have noticed an influx of Jokerz lately that have all gathered to Gotham from around the globe. Meanwhile, Terry goes to Dana's house and meets her brother, Doug. Dana tells Terry that she broke up with him because she has increasingly felt like less of a priority in his life and is open to him making it up to her in the future, but still thinks they should still keep their distance. Later, Bruce sends Terry to the park when he and Barbara suspect a large group of Jokerz. Batman is attacked by a small group of hammer-wielding Jokerz and easily defeats them. Bruce tells Terry to leave as he realizes they are just being tested by the leader of the Jokerz, who is revealed to be Doug.

The Trigger Man
A group of Russians that formerly made frequent deals with Mad Stan (who is thought to be dead) host an arms deal with a group of British Jokerz, who are aware that they have a device that can set off any remote explosives. Mad Stan and his dog, Boom-Boom, arrive and bust the deal as revenge for the Russians using his houseboat without permission, taking the device in the process.

Back at Dana's home, her father confronts Doug in the bathroom and orders him to take his medication. Doug fractures his father's skull and runs off while Dana witnesses the ordeal in shock.

Meanwhile, Bruce uses his new power as Wayne Incorporated CEO to provide the police with upgraded weaponry. Bruce also introduces Terry to the two new Chief Liaisons to the Police Department: Lucius Fox Jr. and Tim Drake. Shortly after, they get word of a gunfight near the boathouses between Mad Stan and the Russians. Batman primarily goes after Stan and lets the Russians escape. Stan defeats Batman and is determined to go after the Russians as they've kidnapped Boom-Boom, threatening to blow up Gotham in the process. After interrogating some criminals, Terry is requested by Max to meet her at a diner, where she plans to tell him about Undercloud. Before she can, a distraught Dana arrives and tells Terry about Doug's past and what he did to their father. Afraid of what her brother will do, she requests Terry to use his connections to Bruce to find and stop Doug. Terry agrees to help her, but decides to focus on taking down Mad Stan first.

Mad Stan and the Russians agree to an exchange between the device and Boom-Boom at an old supermarket. Stan learns about the device's functions and prepares to use it to activate nearby bombs, but he and the Russians are stopped by Batman. Bruce agrees to make finding Doug the top priority. At prison, Stan's lawyer convinces the judge to let Stan see Boom-Boom twice a month.

Legends of the Dark Knight: Jake
This side story focuses on the great-grandnephew of Joe Chill, Jake. Jake is an alcoholic who lives in the lower streets of downtown Gotham through government checks wracked with guilt. He was formerly a security guard at Wayne-Powers Industries before being upgraded to a special security that Derek Powers called his "Quiet Squad" under the command of Powers' right-hand man, Mister Fixx. He enjoyed upgrading his weaponry and the benefits he got from the job until he was ordered to kill Warren McGinnis.

After Warren's death, Jake became depressed after watching Warren's funeral on television and seeing the family that Warren left behind. He descended into alcoholism and was fired after Batman defeated Powers and Fixx and the temporary management at Wayne-Powers discovered the Quiet Squad's existence. He did not look for another job and was evicted from his apartment, which led him to the lower streets. During the night Jake is narrating this, he finds a group of thieves ransacking his house and lashes out at them, using his combat experience to gain the upper hand. After defeating the criminals, he finds a new purpose in life and takes out his old armor from his Quiet Squad days. Jake begins planning on upgrading his equipment and becoming a new hero in Gotham to atone for his sins.

10,000 Clowns
The Jokerz have launched several attacks all over the city, taking over the Ostrander, the Water Treatment Plant, and St. Caspian's Middle School. Bruce has Terry go to the Middle School since the police have the Ostrander under control and there are other power plants to make up for any damage done to one of them. After checking on Dana in the hospital, Terry returns to Wayne Manor, where he finds Bruce under critical condition. Bruce is quickly rushed to Gotham Mercy Hospital, where he is in the final stages of liver failure due to his over usage of painkillers and injuries from his days as Batman. The doctor tells Terry that Bruce is at the top of the organ donor recipient list, hinting that he has known about this for a long time. In a suburban graveyard, Doug has gathered all the Jokerz from around the world for a common goal of chaos, and has now dubbed himself "the Joker King."

Bruce wakes up after two days in the hospital. Terry and the doctors refuse to have him leave. Bruce was aware of his impending liver failure well before he met Terry and has made a large effort behind the scenes to figure out a way to fix it. After Terry storms out, the doctors start panicking as one of them tells Terry that there was a suicide bomber on one of their floors. Terry puts on his Batman suit and heads outside, where he sees another explosion that kills dozens of people. When he tries looking for someone responsible on the scene, he finds an armored man and attacks him. The man calls himself "Vigilante" and claims to be on Batman's side as he is trying to find the mastermind of the attack.

Batman and Vigilante track down another bomber and fail to stop her from blowing up near a skyscraper. With the Justice League off-planet and Max kidnapped by Undercloud, Batman's only allies are the police force, Vigilante, Catwoman, and Dick Grayson. With few options left, Batman is forced to ask Tim Drake to operate the Batcomputer to aid them, requesting him to use the device he got from Mad Stan to deactivate the explosions and send drones with an antidote to rid the other Jokerz of any mind control.

Back at the hospital, Bruce requests to stay behind with Dana's family as the other patients are prioritized and evacuated. Doug arrives and throws Bruce out the window as he prepares to kill his family. Bruce barely manages to contact Terry to come to the hospital. Batman arrives just in time to stop Doug from harming Dana or her parents as Bruce escorts them out. Doug shoots Batman with a projectile that nauseates him, gaining an upper hand in the fight. However, Dick, Catwoman, and Vigilante return to save Batman after they defeated the remaining Jokerz. When Dana shows up to confront her brother, he grabs her, but she elbows him which causes the two to fall off the building. Batman rescues Dana while Doug catches his foot in a large rope and slams his head against the building, killing him instantly.

In the fallout of the Jokerz attack, Dana reflects on her life as she and her mother are in the lobby of the hospital telling the police about Doug while being there for her father. Terry and his family are also there for support. After walking with Terry to talk to her father, she takes him to see Bruce. Dana reveals she figured out that Terry is Batman after Batman called out her name during the rescue, causing her to recall a lot of changes Terry went through after his father's death and that he was supported by the original Batman, Bruce Wayne. Bruce confirms Dana's suspicions and she tells them that she is ready for any consequence that will come from knowing Batman's secret identity. Bruce is then taken away for surgery, as Dana's parents have agreed for Doug's liver to be transplanted into Bruce. Dana tells Terry that they cannot hold any more secrets from each other and the two share a kiss.

Undercloud
While the Jokerz incident was going on, Max was investigating an underground hacking agency called Undercloud as she was taken in by the unknown female leader named Rebel One. When Max outranked all the other hackers of the organization, Rebel One takes Max to her laboratory and reveals her master plan is to bring giant robot made of large, flexible metals with unknown origins to life and destroy Gotham City. Rebel One threatens to kill Max's friends and family if she does not comply.

After checking on Bruce in the hospital, Batman is requested by Commissioner Gordon to stop a bomb threat at a music concert. Batman discovers the villain behind the threat is Shriek, who was sent by Rebel to distract Batman. While finishing up the robot, Max purposefully overloads the resonator to cause a temporary blackout in the Batcave, allowing her to alert Terry without Rebel's knowledge. Knowing the risks of the blackout, Rebel activates the robot she calls "Alloy" to annihilate Gotham.

After taking her and Max outside, Rebel plans to destroy Gotham and rebuild it from the ground up, citing her blames on how Gotham treats the underprivileged poorly. Batman arrives to take care of Alloy, who starts following him despite Rebel's commands and blows up the Batmobile. Max and Batman encounter the creature in a moment of vulnerability, in which it's split up into six parts and appears to know Batman's name. Batman and Max manage to separate the six creatures by using the electricity in Batman's suit and Max rewiring Rebel's remote control to six units instead of one. The six are reformed and are revealed to be Doc Magnus' old creations, the Metal Men. Batman uses the aid of the Metal Men to prevent the Reed buildings that Alloy was smashing from collapsing. Rebel tries smashing her hover car into the building with Max on it, but the Metal Men form a large net to stop her.

During this, Dick Grayson helps Commissioner Gordon evacuate the building and says that he is being more active in the superhero community lately because he does not want Bruce to lead Terry down a dark path. Bruce returns from the hospital to Wayne Manor while Terry and the Metal Men contain the crumbling buildings.

After Batman and the Metal Men succeed, they return to Wayne Manor, where Bruce explains that the creator of the Metal Men, Will Magnus, has been missing and presumed dead for years. To protect the Metal Men from the government and CADMUS, he erased their records, deactivated all of them, reformed them into different objects, and gave them to friends and acquaintances who had no idea what they were holding. To give them a purpose in this new world, Bruce told them they could continue Magnus' plans for them to protect the people of Earth, even providing them with the Injustice Gang's old satellite base to use as a home. The Metal Men accept this new mission and leave Bruce to talk with Terry and Max. Max thinks that they should not dismantle Undercloud, but instead redirect it to contribute to society rather than destroy it like Rebel One intended. Bruce accepts the plan and puts Max in charge of handling Undercloud and looking over the mainframe for the Metal Men's satellite. Bruce tells Terry that he thinks re-establishing old connections and making new ones is especially important with his fluctuating health. He's understanding if Terry doesn't want to continue being Batman, but he still wants Terry to remain a part of the Bat-Family, as Gotham always needs a Batman.

Batgirl Beyond
Commissioner Barbara Gordon finds herself in a lower part of Gotham called Crown Point handling a riot. She starts to get overwhelmed by the rioters until she is assisted by a young woman dressed as Batgirl. The mysterious vigilante criticizes Gordon and the police force for aiding more of the richer parts of Gotham and informs her that someone has been poisoning them for the last couple of weeks.

Gordon talks with a forensic pathologist of the GCPD and finds out that there's been an increased number of individuals who had a strong poison going through their systems before they died. The poison acts as a super steroid that causes the citizens to anger more easily and grow muscles at an exponential rate, similar to Bane's Venom. She goes to the Roake corporation and interrogates the head of the company, Randolph Westley-Smythe. After testing the water and knowing that the citizens of Crown Point are not taking any drugs, she concludes that the Roake corporation is slowly killing them as they have control over all of Crown Point's food division. Randolph confirms her suspicions and tells her that he's killing off most of the citizens to clear the area and make a profit, and they can not stop him thanks to his lawyers. When Barbara leaves, he sends his security to kill her, but she is rescued by Batgirl.

After getting a warrant for Randolph's arrest, Gordon and Batgirl go to his office and defeat him. Batgirl figures out that Gordon was testing her when she nearly lets Randolph go. Randolph was bailed out of jail by his competition, hinting at a larger conspiracy. While Gordon does not approve of or sanction Batgirl, she decides not to take action against the vigilante unless she steps over the line. When Batgirl doubts Gordon's ability to do so, Gordon is quickly able to find out she is secretly a teenager named Nissa and shows up at her high school to negotiate their terms.

Rewired
Nearly a year after the Joker bombings, Mayor William Dusk dies of a sudden heart attack while showcasing the updated Arkham Institute. Despite seeming like a natural cause, Commissioner Gordon and the Mayor's family suspect he was killed by an unseen force. Since the previous year, Terry has enrolled in Neo-Gotham University, broken up with Dana, and now works closely with Barbara and the police with Dick Grayson as his new mentor after a falling out he had with Bruce. Gordon tells Batman that all the inmates claimed they killed the Mayor with the exception of Ghoul. Batman interrogates the criminal, but doesn't get any useful information. Gordon receives info from the coroner that someone killed Dusk by pumping his phone with electricity through the air. The electricity in Arkham then shuts down, leading to a massive prison break. Batman contains the breakout as best as he can as Dick receives a call from Bruce with more information about Dusk's death. Dick ignores Bruce and tells him they have everything under control.

Greg Hoffman is sworn in as replacement mayor and expresses his distrust of Gordon as Commissioner. Terry struggles to maintain his social, academic, and family life due to his duties as Batman. While talking to his mother about his situation, Dusk's killer appears on television and demands Batman to meet him at the offshore rig alone, threatening to overload other peoples' cell phones for every minute he does not show. On the rig, Terry is seemingly pitted against the original Batman, Nightwing, Batgirl, and Robin. However, he breaks the illusion and finds three of his recurring rogues (Spellbinder, Shriek, and Inque) with the unknown criminal that killed Dusk. Batman easily takes out his familiar foes, but the electrical powers of the fourth villain are too much and nearly kill him. The criminal calls himself Rewire and boasts to the GCPD that he killed Batman. Dick shows up at the rig and saves Batman from Rewire before rescuing the rest of the police as Rewire recharges with Ghoul's assistance. When he returns to his jet ski, he finds Batman missing. Meanwhile, Gordon and her men find out that Mayor Dusk was transferring credits to a blind account for a long time, but stopped two months before his death. His wife claims that they were for therapy from Doctor Bennett. Bennett disappeared shortly afterwards, but is found by Gordon in a hidden compartment in his laboratory. Bennett reveals that the funding Dusk put towards therapy and the Arkham project was for his son, Davis, who is secretly Rewire and became a villain due to his hatred for his father's hunger for power and obsession with the city. Davis increases his power by using his father's machine that creates renewable energy through gravity.

Following Batman's disappearance, the freed criminals wreak havoc on Gotham. Bennett reveals to Gordon that Dusk put funding towards a machine in Arkham that could contain Davis and his electrical powers as a last resort. Terry wakes up in the Batcave and finds his wounds patched, his costume fixed, and all the information regarding the case. He leaves the Batcave without speaking a word to Bruce and returns to Dick's hideout, expressing his frustration that Bruce had everything about the case figured out without leaving Wayne Manor. Dick tells Terry that he might never be as good as Bruce, but he should stop pushing his loved ones away and embrace his own life rather than replicate Bruce's. Rewire uses his new power to attack the GCPD and Mayor Hoffman. Batman lures him into the containment machine by having Dick use Spellbinder's orb to disguise himself as Davis' father, distracting Davis long enough for Batman to knock him into the machine. Afterwards, Terry follows Dick's advice and takes a few days off to spend with his family and friends. Back at Arkham, Davis' mother reads a story to the incarcerated Rewire, who shows hints of his powers resurfacing.

The Bat Men
After Terry loses his hearing in a fight with Shriek, Dick provides him with hearing aid headphones. The next day, Terry discovers that his former love and supervillain Melanie is attending Neo-Gotham University part-time. Despite her attempts to start a normal life on her own, Terry is still hesitant to talk with her after the last two times they tried to get together. When Batman helps her take down a couple of criminals, she angrily tells him not to see her again, as she has dropped all connections with the Royal Flush Gang.

Meanwhile, two city assessment workers are kidnapped by an elderly Kirk Langstrom, who is now a bearded Man-Bat capable of human speech. He has turned their sonar scanner into a long-range weapon in the Historical District that could kill thousands of residents and demands three pounds of kanium from Gordon and the police in 24 hours in exchange for their freedom. Mayor Hoffman plans to wipe out the Historical District by calling in the Bureau, but allows Gordon ten (later seven) hours to break into the district, save the hostages, and disable the weapon. She pairs Terry up with Bruce due to the latter's history with Langstrom. Batman and Bruce sneak into the sewer systems to get to the device, where they start arguing about their former partnership. They are then attacked by a large group of Man-Bats and find the formula to be much stronger than Kirk's previous designs, resulting in their defeat by Kirk and his new lover as well as the new She-Bat, Tey.

The two are imprisoned, where Bruce tells Terry what happened to Kirk and his family after their last encounter in "Terror in the Sky" from Batman: The Animated Series. After Batman and Kirk stopped Francine's She-Bat transformations, the Langstroms swore off genetic research. Thanks to a grant from Wayne Enterprises, they became industry pioneers in the study of sonics and had two children. However, Francine was eventually diagnosed with an aggressive form of Parkinson's disease and was given a year to live. Determined to save her, Kirk returned to studying the Man-Bat formula to find a breakthrough that would allow Francine not to lose her mind to the beast. Though he eventually succeeded, he was too late, as Francine died after falling off her chair and breaking her hip in the living room when no one was present. Kirk's children left him in anger after discovering what he had been doing during Francine's final months. When real life proved too much for him, Kirk became the Man-Bat again. They learn from Kirk that three years prior, he rescued Tey from the Jokerz and gave her the Man-Bat formula to help her survive. She became the new She-Bat and the two fell in love and formed the Cult of the Bat to give Kirk a second chance at having a family. He plans to use the kanium to help the other Man-Bats gain more control over their transformations like him.

Tey convinces Kirk to start the weapon when she thinks they are not going to get the kanium. Bruce and Terry escape using Terry's headphones, which Bruce reveals that Dick got from him. Batman gives the Bureau air support while Bruce goes to talk to Kirk at the weapon. Bruce deactivates the Bureau's satellite and tries to reason with Kirk. Convinced that both him and Bruce are monsters, Kirk redirects the weapon into a bomb to just kill them both, but Batman manages to get to the building in time to save Bruce. Kirk tells Bruce to use his second chance wisely as he uses the device kill himself. Terry decides to give Melanie another chance and goes to the diner she works at to talk to her.

Dick and Barbara eventually meet at the diner Melanie works at to catch up with each other. Barbara thinks that Dick has held Sam against her will and feels that she ruined his life, but Dick responds that he just wants the best for her. Barbara wants them to be friends again, but thinks it is best if they just focused on their work and Terry for now. Dick snaps an old batarang in half that the two share, the same batarang that he gave Barbara to save her father, that he was going to propose to her with, and gave to her on her the day of her wedding to Sam.

Justice Lords Beyond: Another World
In a crossover with Justice League Beyond, Batman finds himself in the Justice Lords timeline where he and the rest of the League try to find out what happened to Wonder Woman. When he is first transported to the world, he is confronted by this world's version of Dick Grayson, who has both eyes and is a commander of the Justice Lord Task Force. They use an EMP blast to disable Batman's suit, but Terry manages to escape. He finds his counterpart in this world, who is a blond Jokerz member named T. T reveals to Terry that this world's Bruce Wayne was killed years ago for standing against the other Justice Lords. Terry takes the two of them to Wayne Manor, where he finds the house destroyed. The two are cornered by the Jokerz gang, but defeat them when Terry finds an upgraded Batsuit in the Batcave. They are then confronted by Justice Lord Superman, who arrests T and supposedly kills Terry.

However it is revealed on the Task Force ship that Terry's death was a projection given by the suit (with similar technology to Spellbinder). Batman escapes from the ship and goes into the Batcave, where he retrieves the Batmobile and a message from the deceased Justice Lord Batman. He goes to the JLTF headquarters to rescue T and convinces the alternate Dick to join them by showing that Justice Lord Batman imbued the new Batsuit with a synthetic kryptonite to use against Justice Lord Superman. T chooses to stay behind while Dick and Terry go to the Watchtower to gain access to the Portal Generator under disguise. After the disguise easily breaks, Terry and Dick are rescued by T, who changed his mind and aids them transporting Terry back to his world.

Terry's kryptonite suit allows the Justice League to defeat Justice Lord Superman. He then returns to the Lords' timeline to give back the suit and talk to T one last time. T allows Terry to talk to the alive Warren McGinnis of this world as repayment. Terry gets emotional for having a chance to talk to his father again and rewatches their conversation when he gets back to Dick's headquarters. While they watch the recap through Terry's recorder, Dick gets the chance to see his Justice Lords counterpart, who is married to Barbara and has a son named Jon. Though shocked, Dick accepts that some things are bound to be different in alternate timelines. In the Justice Lord timeline, Dick and T are inspired by Terry to continue Bruce's work as T prepares to become the Batman Beyond of his world.

Mark of the Phantasm
This story takes place a year before the current events and explains what led Terry to leave Bruce. After a night fending off the Jokerz, Batman and Vigilante go their separate ways. During the fight, Vigilante's blood was spilled on the scene and collected by the police, who identify him as Jake Chill. Jake is attacked by the Phantasm in his apartment, who demands his death for the murder of Warren McGinnis. Batman manages to arrive just as Phantasm escapes and leaves behind a gas. After Jake tells Terry his role in Warren's death, Batman starts ruthlessly beating up Jake and is only stopped by Bruce's intervention. When Terry returns to the Batcave, Bruce tells him that he inhaled some of Andrea's fear toxin and started acting irrationally. Terry asks Bruce if he knew about Jake, but Bruce denies it. Terry suspects he's lying given how Jake worked at Wayne Enterprises and was related to the killer of Bruce's parents, Joe Chill.

Terry goes to Dick and Barbara after his talk with Bruce. The two decide to tell Terry what led to the Bat-Family falling apart. While Tim Drake was recovering from the Joker's psychological trauma (as seen in the flashbacks of Return of the Joker), Barbara quit being Batgirl and ended her relationship with Bruce. Dick returned to Gotham after hearing what happened and felt guilty that he wasn't there for Tim. Dick and Barbara rekindled their relationship, with Dick even planning to propose to Barbara at one point. However, Barbara found out that she was pregnant with Bruce's child and refused to tell Dick about it. Bruce told Dick about the pregnancy himself, leading his former sidekick to lash out at him. Barbara had a miscarriage after stopping a couple of thieves in an alley. A year later, Barbara would meet Sam at the D.A.'s office and eventually married him as she and Dick severed their ties with Bruce.

Bruce tells Terry that Vigilante and the Jokerz are at the library, where the gang injects an upgraded Joker toxin into Jake to send him into a maniacal rampage. As this is happening, Andrea reunites with Bruce in the Batcave. She tells Bruce that she needs to kill Jake as she's afraid that Terry might do it, and she's aware Bruce is also afraid of the same thing and lied to Terry about not knowing Jake prior before she heads to the library. Batman manages to defeat the Jokerz and prevents Phantasm from stabbing Jake, but the Joker toxin and Andrea's fear gas prove too much for Jake and he dies of a seizure.

Terry feels guilty about Jake's death and goes to the Batcave after finding out Bruce told Dana and Max what happened so they could comfort him. He loses his trust in Bruce after finding out what happened to Dick and Barbara and decides to end their partnership. It's revealed that Andrea was hired by Amanda Waller to take out Jake as killing goes against what Batman represents. In the Arkham Institute, Davis Dusk meets Ghoul in the middle of his father's interview with a reporter, which eventually leads him into becoming Rewire. In the present, Rewire is released from Arkham thanks to Ghoul acting as his lawyer.

All In
Terry starts making frequent visits to the Justice Lords timeline to monitor T's training as the Batman of his world and to talk to the alternate version of his father using the portal in the Batcave. He also starts dating Melanie again, who is going through some financial struggles. After one of his visits, Terry sees some files Bruce made about the new Royal Flush Gang that Queen created.

Meanwhile, Ghoul gives Davis an apartment under an unknown name and shows him a new formula to perfect his powers. However, Davis wants to get his old life back rather than going back to crime. Ghoul chooses to partner with Inque instead and gives her a formula that could take away her weakness to water. Inque makes Melanie an offer to steal from the new Royal Flush Gang by trying to gain her spot as Ten back, which would allow her enough to get through college and Inque to afford the chemical process that augments her shapeshifting that would allow her to start over as a new person. Melanie reluctantly accepts the job.

After Batman interrogates Jack and gets him arrested, he sees the Bat-Signal and discovers Melanie was the one activating it. She tells Batman that she is playing both Queen and Inque and wants his help to bring both of them down. Batman agrees to help, but is hesitant to trust her. At night, she and Inque come aboard the Royal Flush Gang submarine and take out her mother. Inque plans to leave Melanie behind while taking the most valuable prize of the vault, Two-Face's coin. Melanie and Batman manage to defeat and arrest Inque and the Royal Flush Gang. Barbara notices that Two-Face's coin is still missing and theorizes it went down with the submarine. Terry thinks Melanie stole it and confronts her about it. She is hurt by Terry's accusation and decides to break up with him.

Davis' attempts to rebuild his life fall apart, as his former friends and family hate and fear him for his actions. After hearing about the Justice Lords incident, he steals Ghoul's formula and becomes Rewire again. He electrocutes Ghoul as he plans to cross over to the Justice Lords timeline and find the alternate version of his father.

Alternating Currents
Rewire breaks into Dick's loft and kidnaps him. When Terry arrives at the Batcave after another visit to the Justice Lords timeline, Bruce shows Terry a video of Davis holding Dick hostage and demanding to use the portal to the timeline to see his father. Bruce melts the portal to prevent both Terry and Davis from accessing it, citing it as Terry's weakness in the last couple of months. After Barbara tells Terry that Ghoul woke up from his coma caused by Rewire's attack, Batman interrogates the criminal in his hospital room to learn where the anti-serum for Rewire is. He arrives at the docks and injects the anti-serum into Rewire, but it does not work.

Barbara attempts to help Dick remove a device attached to his chest that continually electrocutes him. Batman tries to tire Rewire out to short out his electrical powers, but is defeated. Dick rips the device off of his chest and attaches it to Rewire, which defeats the villain but nearly kills himself in the process. Terry returns to the Batcave to check on the portal device and is met by T and the alternate Dick. After Terry failed to show up for a baseball game he promised to see with his dad, Warren went to T's apartment, where T told Warren the truth about himself and Terry. Warren was accepting of T's explanation and was eager to see both of them again. However, Terry refuses the offer as he has accepted that the alternate Warren is not his true father and encourages T to go as he should appreciate the people he has in his life before they are gone. T and his mentor say their last goodbyes before returning to their timeline. The series ends with Terry, Bruce, Barbara, and Dick having a meal in Dick's hospital room.

Batman Beyond (vol. 5) mainstream DCU series (2015–2016)

DC Comics announced that another ongoing Batman Beyond series would be released in June 2015. It takes place in the future of its current stories' history. Following the conclusion of The New 52: Futures End, Tim Drake was the titular character instead of Terry McGinnis, who settles in the latter's time period and helps raise McGinnis's brother Matt in his absence. The first issue is written by Dan Jurgens with art by Bernard Chang. The series concluded after 16 issues before leading into the DC Rebirth event.

Plot

Brave New Worlds
Following Tim's time displacement and Terry's death in Future's End, Tim finds himself in the future as the new Batman Beyond in Neo-Gotham. He allies himself with Terry's brother, Matt McGinnis, and his guardian, Nora Boxer. Matt has a difficult time accepting Tim filling in for his brother's shoes. Tim finds out that Neo-Gotham is the safest and one of the few inhabitable places left on Earth following Brother Eye's destruction. With his artificial intelligence A.L.F.R.E.D., Tim's first mission as the new Batman is to infiltrate Brother Eye's Lodge and rescue the older Commissioner Barbara Gordon and Terry's friend Maxine Gibson. During the rescue, he gains a new ally in the form of one of Terry's archenemies, Inque, who was allied with Brother Eye because he has her daughter, Deanna Clay, hostage on the moon. Batman and Inque escape with Barbara and a tortured Max into Neo-Gotham, but Tim finds out that Brother Eye let them escape because he downloaded himself into A.L.F.R.E.D., allowing him to pinpoint Neo-Gotham's location. Neo-Gotham is attacked by Brother Eye's forces, which included robotocized versions of Superman, Wonder Woman, and John Stewart. Due to the damage Tim's suit has taken, Barbara gives Tim the suit that her father wore when he replaced Batman. Batman manages to defeat all the robots with the help of the last surviving Justice League member, Micron. Tim is then teleported to the moon for his final showdown against Brother Eye. He manages to defeat the villain with the help of Inque, who sacrifices herself to ensure Brother Eye is destroyed and that her daughter is safe.

City of Yesterday
Tim starts settling into his new role as the Batman of the future with Barbara acting as his tech support similar to how Bruce acted for Terry. Meanwhile, Matt recovered John Stewart's arm after Terry's battle with the robots and uses the Green Lantern ring to find out more about the city of Metropolis. Matt runs away to Metropolis, forcing Tim to go after him. In Neo-Gotham, Barbara and Mayor Luke Fox have to deal with an overwhelming amount of citizens from Metropolis and other desolated cities who want to break into Neo-Gotham. Luke does not allow them in due to the limited supplies they have for the inhabiting citizens as it is, but they eventually bust the wall and start overwhelming the security. In the desolated Metropolis, Tim finds himself pitted against splicers under the order of Dr. Abel Cuvier and Tuftan, members of the Evil Factory and former allies of Brother Eye. Matt finds the Justice League imprisoned within the Watchtower in Metropolis, but when he frees them to help Tim, they do not cooperate as they have a device implanted on them to make it look like every person they see are robots created by Brother Eye. They are stopped when Tim and Matt rescue Superman (who in this reality is Clark's son, Jonathan Kent). The Justice League returns to Neo-Gotham to put the intruding citizens under control and begin working to improve the world.

Wired for Death
After the Justice League's return, Tim focuses on stopping a recurring foe during his time as Batman, Davis Dusk aka Rewire. Rewire is revealed to be an alive Terry McGinnis, who was brainwashed by the villain Spellbinder (who projects himself to Terry as an old woman named Doris Shelby) into thinking he was Davis Dusk and that Batman wanted him dead. Terry used the Rewire suit to instigate four nights of power outages, causing riots which kept the police and Batman distracted from Spellbinder's activities. After Rewire fights Barbara and she discovers his true identity, Terry knocks her out and brings her to Blackgate, where Spellbinder brainwashes her too. Tim shows up to Blackgate and faces off against the brainwashed Barbara and Rewire. After Tim knocks off Rewire's helmet and discovers that Terry's alive (which he realizes was caused by altering the timeline in the past), Matt takes the Batmobile to Blackgate and distracts Terry from Tim by trying to free him from Spellbinder's illusion. Tim ultimately defeats Spellbinder and Terry's memories are restored. The four of them return to the Batcave, where Tim gives the mantle of Batman back to Terry and leaves to learn more about this foreign world. Though saddened by Tim's departure, the group is glad that Terry is back as Batman.

Batman Beyond (vol. 6) DC Rebirth series (2016–2020)
DC Comics announced another ongoing Batman Beyond series would be released in October 2016. It takes place after the previous series, with Terry McGinnis returning as the titular character, where he must deal the Jokerz after they take over a section of the city and plan to resurrect the deceased Joker. The series is written by Dan Jurgens and drawn by Bernard Chang.

Plot

Escaping the Grave
Terry concentrates his efforts on taking down the Jokerz gang with Commissioner Gordon. He and Matt are living together again with Max, who has recovered from Brother Eye's torture. Terry's ex-girlfriend, Dana Tan, operates as a social worker and is kidnapped by the Jokerz while working in the slums of Neo-Gotham. After Terry witnesses her kidnapping on the news, he goes to the streets to investigate only to be attacked by a Joker that is pumped up on Bane's drug, Venom. Batman struggles to defeat the man and barely escapes the madness, blaming his shortcomings on not being Batman for the last couple of months. He comes up with a new plan to rescue Dana by disguising himself as a Joker named Trey Malone, the son of "Matches" Malone.

Meanwhile, Dana is taken to the leader of the Jokerz, Carter Wilson, aka Terminal. Terminal's ultimate plan is to resurrect the Joker, who supposedly died during a showdown with Batman years ago. Terry proves his worth to Carter by seemingly destroying the Batmobile with Max and Matt's help. Dana recognizes Terry and catches up with him when the other Jokerz are not looking. However, when she shows Carter's plan to him, the Jokerz spot them and Carter reveals he knew that Trey was Terry all along (as they went to high school together). The Jokerz knock them out and hang them upside down above a vat of acid. Terry manages to escape using one of his batarangs and gets Dana to the roof, where Matt gives him an upgraded Batsuit and he reveals his secret to Dana in the process. Terminal escapes with the Joker's body before Batman can find him. By examining the fingerprints Carter used to get to Wayne Enterprises, Terry discovers that Carter's plan to resurrect the Joker is actually a ruse. The comatose body Terminal has in his possession is a disguised and drugged Bruce Wayne, who Carter is using to fund his future crimes.

Bruce was thought to have died during the attack of the cyborgs. Terminal tells his assistant that he found Bruce's body under medical alert in the triage tents after the war. He kidnapped and drugged Bruce while giving him the necessary medical attention to obtain the Keystone, the world's ultimate intel gathering device. Batman emerges from the vault and stops Terminal from stealing the Keystone. Terminal's assistant wakes Bruce up and taunts him before tossing him off the building. Terry rescues Bruce while Terminal and his assistant fly away. Matt uses a rocket launcher to take down the ship, forcing the two criminals to crash in a nearby location. After Terry rescues Bruce, he ignores Bruce's pleas to go after Terminal and his assistant whom Bruce recognizes. At the crash site, Terminal's assistant is revealed to be the real Joker, who beats Wilson to death with a crowbar before walking off into the night.

Rise of the Demon
After returning to the Batcave, Bruce becomes concerned about Terry's new suit. Meanwhile, Curare is on the run from the League of Assassins and breaks into the GCPD to tell Commissioner Gordon she needs to speak with Batman. The two go on the rooftop to activate the Bat-Signal, but are ambushed by the League in the process. Terry brings Dana back to her house and tells her that he will prioritize his own life before Batman's duties and not end up like Bruce. When Barbara turns on the Bat-Signal, Terry initially chooses to ignore it before Bruce contacts Dana with footage of the fight to get Terry to help. Batman assists Barbara and Curare, though he is noticeably more brutal in his approach. After the fight, Curare shows Batman a video confirming that Ra's al Ghul is alive. Bruce orders Terry to return to the Batcave to discard the suit, as it was a prototype that Bruce built with an artificial intelligence that blocks the wearer's pain. Bruce used it in his last mission to stop a group of criminals called the Banes, and the injuries sustained from his suit ended his career as Batman. Terry refuses to return and heads to Ghul's hideout in the Himalayas with Curare's flier as she is critically wounded by the Demon's right-hand man, Koru. Bruce follows Terry, worrying about Ghul's return and the suit's effect on him. After Terry defeats Ghul's forces, Ra's comes out to battle Terry himself; claiming that Terry is nothing more than a pretender to Batman's legacy. During their fight, Terry knocks off Ghul's mask, revealing that he is Bruce's son and the former Robin, Damian Wayne.

Prior to Bruce's retirement, Damian spent time in Europe and discovered Ra's was planning to capitalize on Batman's absence by sending the high-tech League of Assassins to invade Gotham. Damian donned the prototype Batsuit to become the new Batman to defend the city and nearly wiped out all of Ghul's army in four hours. Bruce figured that Ra's set Damian up to cut loose with the Batsuit to gain the perfect opportunity to recruit his grandson into the fold. During the climb up the Himalayas, Bruce is overpowered by Koru (confirmed to be Ubu's son) before using his grappling hook gun on him. In the temple, Damian has the advantage over Terry thanks to his superior combat experience and knowledge of Terry's Batsuit. He lures Terry into a group of speakers that jam the suit's cyberlink. Damian doesn't kill Terry and starts arguing with his father, telling Bruce that the suit wasn't the sole reason for his departure and that he felt betrayed when he saw Bruce had recruited Terry as the new Batman. He joined Ra's Al Ghul after realizing that Bruce was too focused on Gotham rather than the world and became his grandfather's successor as Ra's could no longer use the Lazarus Pits to prolong his life. Ra's correctly predicted that Bruce's Brother Eye would lead to a global disaster and prepared a number of missiles to "purify" the Earth after Brother Eye's onslaught. When Terry continues to lose to Damian, the suit takes over his body and causes him to fight more lethally. Damian summons his bat dragon Goliath to take Batman down, but Terry seemingly chokes Goliath to death, prompting an enraged Damian to duel him once more.

Bruce attempts to stop Damian's missiles from launching, but is attacked by Koru, looking to kill Bruce to avenge his father. Damian and Terry stop fighting to save Bruce from Koru, and Terry manages to overcome the suit's control. Bruce tells Damian that he knows deep down that his destructive plan is unreasonable tries to convince him to abandon course so they can work together peacefully. Damian reconsiders after finding out that Goliath is alive thanks to Bruce giving him an Adrenalin shot. Koru launches the missiles himself, which are DNA toxins designed to eradicate the weak. Terry flies into the sky and takes down most of the missiles with pulse blasters while Max takes out the final missile using Bruce's satellite. Terry's suit runs out of power just as he exits Earth's atmosphere, but he is rescued by Bruce and Damian. Bruce offers Damian the chance to rejoin them in Gotham, but Damian chooses to stay behind as he believes there's more good that can come out of leading the League before he returns home.

Batwomen Beyond
During the "Rise of the Demon" storyline, Commissioner Barbara Gordon is kidnapped while investigating Crown Point, a crime-ridden part of Gotham that's protected by a teenager named Nissa who operates as Batgirl. Max gets an alert on Barbara's capture and heads to Crown Point to investigate while leaving Matt to guard the Batcave. Max offers to assist Batgirl and tells the hero she's one of Batman's allies, but Batgirl doesn't trust Batman since he hasn't shown up to combat the multiple criminal activities that occur in Crown Point. Max reveals that she's helped with some of their cases behind the scenes using her technological knowledge. The two team up and take down the dirty cops that captured Barbara (with Max using holograms for illusion-based tactics inspired by Zatanna). Barbara and Max offer their aid to Batgirl whenever she or Crown Point need their help.

Gotham Games
Batman is sent by Commissioner Gordon to deactivate three Gotham Aerial Defense Systems that are rigged to take down any aerial vehicle. Terry tries to get the work done as fast as possible to watch Matt and Max compete in the Gotham Games, a futuristic basketball competition. His first target is in the Gotham Transit Authority, where he is attacked by Shriek, a former super villain who is now the self-appointed protector of the people that still live in the tunnels. When Batman comes out of a manhole into Chinatown, he is attacked by a new vigilante named Hacker, a young technological genius named Bo Han who gained the ability to hack nearly any technology with his hands during Brother Eye's invasion. He drives Batman out of Chinatown, leading Terry to find another one of the sabotaged aerial defense systems. Batman is attacked by the culprit behind the attacks, Freon of the Terrific Trio. She was resurrected thanks to Dr. Hodges using experimental molecular sieves to absorb and contain her radioactive decay, but the exposure to her kills him. Blaming Batman and Gotham for the deaths of her colleagues, she's rigged the city's defense systems to make Gotham destroy itself. Batman is assisted by Shriek and Hacker to contain Freon and stop her attack.

The Long Payback
Bruce is now in a wheelchair after his fight with Koru and allows Terry and Matt to stay in the Manor to look after him. Terry has decided to fully embrace his life as Batman while still trying to maintain a healthy relationship with Dana. Barbara calls Bruce to inform him about a new vigilante in Gotham and voice her concerns about Terry continuing the Batman legacy. Bruce sends a new Batsuit to Terry when the Royal Flush Gang (consisting of only King, Ace, and a new Jack) crash a renewal of the Gotham Museum of Fine Arts to draw Batman out for their unknown client. After Terry destroys Ace and captures King and Jack, the client sends Stalker out to capture Batman in exchange for giving his decimated village supplies needed for survival. When Terry returns to Dana's apartment, Stalker kidnaps her to lure Batman to him. Terry frees Dana from Stalker's clutches, but their fight escalates when they crash into an office tower and set it ablaze. Stalker sets up a number of cameras for the whole world to see Batman's unmasking as he disobeys his client's orders not to kill Terry.

Stalker's assassination attempt is interfered by the client, Payback, who wishes to kill Batman himself. He cuts off Stalker's mechanical legs with his plasma whip before preparing to confront Terry. Batman attempts to rescue Stalker from the fire and is suddenly assisted by Melanie Walker aka Ten of the Royal Flush Gang, who has been taking down criminals on her own lately to prove to Terry she's reformed. Payback captures Ten and sends Batman and Stalker flying out of the building. Stalker repays Batman for the earlier assist by using Ten's glider to save him. Payback brings Melanie to his lair to torture her before teleporting Batman into a series of traps in the room. Batman initially assumes Payback is the grown-up Kenny Stanton, but it turns out to be Kenny's father. Kenny was placed in a rehab facility after Batman defeated him and was driven to suicide from suffering the constant bullying from the older inmates and further neglect from his father. Blaming Batman for his son's death, Dr. Stanton prepares to eliminate Terry and Melanie using his advanced weaponry.

After witnessing Terry's struggles and knowing Bruce is too injured to intervene, Matt (who's been secretly training himself with holograms of Bruce's sessions with Damian) becomes the new Robin and rides a sky cycle to Payback's hideout to destroy the power generators, freeing Terry from Dr. Stanton's traps. With Matt and Melanie's assistance, Terry manages to knock out Payback before angrily dragging Matt back to the Batcave. He and Dana are outraged at Bruce for putting Matt's life in danger, but Matt still wants to operate as Robin. Before he can figure out what to do about his younger brother, Terry uses Wayne Tech resources to deliver the necessary supplies to Stalker's village.

Target: Batman
Despite Terry's protests about Matt becoming the new Robin, Bruce encourages him to be a proper mentor towards his younger brother and has developed a prototype Robin suit for Matt with similar functions to Terry's costume. Melanie arrives at the manor to catch up with Terry and asks him if he wants to start their relationship over. Dana arrives shortly after to tell Terry that she cannot handle dealing with his responsibilities as Batman, but she instead witnesses Melanie kissing Terry and runs home in tears. Before Terry and Melanie can discuss their relationship further, Bruce and Matt bring Terry into the manor as they've received word of Jokerz member Scab holding a shootout at the police headquarters while claiming that there is a bat monster coming after him. Bruce has Terry bring Matt along to save Barbara and the other hostages. Terry defeats Scab, but is unsatisfied with Matt's performance and forbids him to be Robin. Meanwhile, Adalyn Stern, the co-anchor to Jack Ryder on the News 52, arrives home and is confronted by a monster that looks like Batman. However, Adalyn's A.I. cube tells her that she was alone all night the next day.

Batman interrogates the Jokerz on Scab's behavior, but the criminals treat him like a demon as well. Jack meets up with Melanie, whom he is co-sponsoring in a criminal rehab program, before encountering Adalyn, who panics after seeing Batman's shadow. Terry goes to Dana's apartment to talk with her, but she also sees Batman as a monster and calls the cops. As he flies out, he sees a group of citizens and Jokerz burning down a Batman statue and chanting to kill the demon. When he goes down to dispel the chaos, both sides start to attack him with Barbara and the police joining them shortly afterwards. Realizing Batman needs assistance against the violent citizens, Bruce provides Matt with a new Robin costume and access to the Batmobile to aid Terry. The villain behind the attack is revealed to be a new version of the Scarecrow using fear to manipulate the populace against Batman and Robin. Thanks to Bruce's knockout gas, the new Dynamic Duo safely take out the citizens as Scarecrow escapes.

Meanwhile, the News 52 prepares to cover the riot, but Jack refuses to anchor it without Adalyn. He goes to her apartment and learns that she was alone all night writing down "The Bat" on hundreds of sheets of paper. Jack then goes to the Batcave to learn Adalyn's connection to Batman with Bruce's help. They find out that Bruce ruthlessly beat up Adalyn's father (who was a notorious gang leader) right in front of her when he was Batman over twenty years ago. Terry and Matt return to the Batcave just as Jack leaves and determine that the new Scarecrow does not use fear gas to brainwash the population like Jonathan Crane did. When they go back on patrol, Scarecrow ignites Gotham's fear of Batman even further, which proves strong enough to turn Robin and Bruce against Batman. Bruce turns off the visual feed so he can still help Terry via audio. Jack eventually finds Adalyn in the News 52 building, where he discovers that she is the new Scarecrow and is using the A.I. cubes in every home to instill fear in Neo-Gotham against Batman. Jack is unaffected by the cubes thanks to his days as the Creeper and relays the information to Bruce so he can jam the signal. Melanie, who is also unaffected since she didn't own an A.I. cube, suits up as Ten to help Batman fight Robin. When Matt starts overwhelming them, Terry takes off his mask to get his brother to no longer see him as the monster, revealing his identity to Melanie in the process. Bruce manages to jam Adalyn's signal and turns Neo-Gotham back to normal. Adalyn is arrested and taken to Arkham, as she sees herself only as the Scarecrow. Back at the manor, the team discuss Melanie knowing their secret and Jack expresses his anger at Bruce for ruining Adalyn's life as Batman.

The Final Joke
On the 100th birthday of Thomas Wayne, the city holds a ceremony for Bruce deeding over the Wayne Family Center of Tomorrow to Neo-Gotham. Dick Grayson, now the mayor of Blüdhaven, reunites with Bruce at the celebration with his daughter, Elainna. The ceremony is interrupted by a train that veers off track and blows up the building. Batman and Robin are barely able to save their friends from the explosion. Meanwhile, Commissioner Gordon has been investigating a trail of gruesome Jokerz deaths. When she witnesses the train attack on television, she goes to her office to contact the White House, only to find the Joker (who was behind the Jokerz' deaths) sitting in her chair. They fight, but the Joker manages to escape in a taxi while witnessing Batman and the new Robin rescuing civilians at the destroyed Wayne Tower. Barbara eventually informs the group about the Joker's return.

The Joker sends a suicide bomber to blow up a novelty store that was supplying the Jokerz. He recruits a couple of the gang members and rebrands them as "the Throwbacks", with their new goal being to make Neo-Gotham more like the old Gotham. Terry takes a break from searching the city for the Joker to catch up with Melanie. As the two reexamine their relationship, Robin arrives to inform Terry about the store explosion. Batman and Robin arrive at the site and are attacked by the Throwbacks. Robin is attacked by one member who was converted into a cyborg and controlled by the Joker known as "Joker Beyond". During the fight, the Joker overhears Terry contacting Bruce and becomes determined to find out who Terry was talking to. Robin ends up crashing in the slums and is kidnapped by the Joker. When Matt's communication and tracking device goes offline, Dick takes the Batmobile and assists Terry in destroying Joker Beyond. Their victory is short-lived as the Joker reveals to them he has Robin and plans to kill him with the same crowbar that killed Jason Todd decades ago unless Robin reveals who "Bruce" is.

As Batman and Dick search through the city, the Joker starts broadcasting Robin's torture on television. When Robin refuses to give up Bruce's identity, Joker orders his henchmen to put Matt in a casket and light it on fire. Thanks to Dick tracing the broadcast's point of origin, he and Batman locate the Joker's hideout and defeat the henchmen. However, they find the casket empty as the Joker's broadcast was prerecorded. Shortly afterwards, the Joker arrives with the captive Robin in the Batcave after Matt gave up Bruce's secret. He shoots Elainna in the shoulder before taking on Bruce with his crowbar. Bruce eventually gains the upper hand by stabbing his broken cane into the Joker's arm and stealing his gun. Joker tries goading Bruce into shooting him, but he suddenly dies of a heart attack. Days later, Matt develops post-traumatic stress disorder from the ordeal as Barbara confirms to the group at the morgue that the Joker is truly dead. Matt tries to help Terry round up the last of the Jokerz as Robin, but ends up getting saved by Dick when he freezes in place after one of the criminals attacks him with a crowbar. Despite Matt's protests, Terry, Dick, and Bruce all agree that he should no longer be Robin. Back at the morgue, an elderly Harley Quinn steals the Joker's corpse.

Divide, Conquer and Kill

Shortly after a trip to Arkham Asylum, Bruce begins acting strangely around Matt and Terry. He starts drinking, doesn't offer any helpful advice for Batman, and doesn't show any concern for Terry's safety. As this is going on, Terry battles a new foe named Splitt, who has super speed and the ability to briefly separate into two brothers named Caden and Adam. Thanks to their overwhelming speed, they are able to escape Batman with a key they are trying to use for an unknown device. Melanie and Matt discover that during Batman's battle with Splitt, Bruce was gambling at a casino. As he starts heading back to the mansion with a date, he orders A.L.F.R.E.D. to kick Matt and Melanie out of the mansion. Terry confronts Bruce for his behavior on the Graham Tower. Bruce orders A.L.F.R.E.D. to block transmission in the Batcave as he shoots Terry with a neural shocker and tackles him off the building.

Melanie visits Arkham Asylum to find out what's wrong with Bruce. When Dr. Sheehan tells her that there was a power outage during Bruce's visit, Melanie finds the cell Bruce was close to when the lights went out and frees the current masked prisoner, who attacks her and the guards. Terry seemingly returns to the Batcave to inform Matt that Bruce was replaced by a doppelganger. As Terry overrides the fake Bruce's commands to access A.L.F.R.E.D.'s transmissions, Melanie knocks out the prisoner and unmasks him, revealing him to be the real Bruce. Dr. Sheehan informs them that the impostor is False Face, a criminal with the ability to take on the form of anyone he touches. Bruce wasn't able to tell the guards who he was because False Face can make whoever he's disguised as lose all sense of themselves. Unbeknownst to the team, False Face has already disguised himself as Terry and left the real Terry out in the streets. Terry loses his I.D. and wallet to a group of criminals and cannot remember who he is.

Days later, Bruce has regained his memories, False Face operates as a merciless Batman, and Terry lives homeless in the slums. Terry is framed for murder by a criminal and is forced to evade a group of corrupt cops. After the team locates Splitt at a Powers facility, False Face arrives and battles them as Batman before proposing an alliance with them, revealing his true identity to Bruce, Melanie, and Matt in the process. Splitt tells him that they are stealing Powers tech to permanently separate themselves and to stop their speed powers from rapidly aging them. False Face begins leading them to the Batcave so he can find a way to exploit their powers for his own benefit. Melanie borrows one of Batman's utility belts to confront them and Bruce contacts the retired Barry Allen to assist her. After defeating Splitt, Barry agrees to help them activate the stabilizer matrix Powers previously used on them to save their lives. However, as soon as he activates the machine, False Face arrives and tries to stop the process. His interference with the energy flow causes a massive explosion that kills him and makes Splitt disappear. Since False Face died disguised as Terry, Terry's memories do not return to him. Terry is left wandering the streets as a murder suspect robbing restaurants with another homeless individual. One night, a woman breaks into the Batcave and steals Terry's Batsuit, vowing to protect Neo-Gotham herself.

First Flight
Terry continues to be on the run from the police with his new acquaintance, Constance Gustinov, as Neo-Gotham is left wondering what happened to Batman. When someone wearing the Batsuit begins saving some of the citizens, Jack Ryder catches the hero in the act and finds out that a woman wearing the costume. Bruce and Matt initially believe that the new Batwoman is either Melanie or Barbara, but both women deny stealing the suit when asked. Meanwhile, Derek Powers a.k.a. Blight breaks into Powers Industries and reclaims his containment suit.

Blight breaks into Wayne Enterprises and battles Batwoman. Bruce and Matt witness their fight with the facility's security cameras, during which Matt learns that Powers murdered his father, Warren McGinnis. Batwoman finds out that Blight is slowly dying and searching for a host body to possess. She ends the fight by using a bomb to rupture Blight's containment suit and bring the facility's roof down before escaping. Blight survives the attack, but finds his condition is worsening. Meanwhile, Terry learns that Constance was formerly the top researcher for Powers' biomechanical engineering program and developed a deadly mutagenic toxin. She became a criminal on the run after Warren reported her for unlawful research. She learns Terry's true identity through a retinal scanner, but refuses to tell him out of spite. Blight later calls her to tell her he needs a new host body for his consciousness, and she decides the amnesiac Terry is the perfect candidate as it would allow her to get revenge on Warren.

As they prepare Terry's body for the transfer, Blight sends his men to attack Wayne Industries facilities with a doomsday device known as "Devourers". When Bruce and Matt invite Barbara and Melanie to the Batcave to determine Batwoman's identity, Blight's men arrive to unleash a Devourer on Wayne Manor. While Batwoman fights off Blight's men, Dick Grayson arrives at the manor and disarms the Devourer. Batwoman quickly flees the scene when Dick offers to help her. Dick tells Bruce he came to Gotham after Elainna went missing, leading the group to deduce that she is the new Batwoman. At Powers Industries, Constance knocks out Terry and places him inside a capsule to transfer Blight's mind into his body. She restores Terry's memory in order to fully sweep his mind clean just before Batwoman arrives and cuts off the power. Elainna manages to rescue Terry and the two escape the facility just as Powers' suit ruptures further. With his only chance at survival gone, Blight kills Constance and vows to use his dying moments to get revenge on Bruce. Now knowing Bruce's secrets after going through his records, he attacks the group in the Batcave just before Batwoman and Terry return. Terry puts on his original Batsuit to become Batman once more and teams up with Batwoman to battle Blight. After Dick manages to briefly incapacitate the villain, Terry pins Powers with the Batmobile and directs it to dig a large hole into the ocean floor before self-destructing it to keep the last of Blight and his radiation contained.

The Eradication Agenda
As the Batcave under Wayne Manor is being rebuilt, Bruce relocates himself, Terry, and Matt to a Wayne Industries building in the middle of the city, where he has set up an urban Batcave hidden by holographic technology that the McGinnis brothers call "The Batsuite". Terry is then alerted of data thieves known as Slamjackers attacking a government building and leaves to defeat them as Batman. After defeating the criminals, he is approached by a distraught Goliath, who leads him to a critically wounded Damian. As they bring Damian to the new hideout to receive medical treatment, they are attacked by the League of Assassins. They manage to evade the ninjas thanks to the hideout's defensive measures and heal Damian's wounds with Bruce's recovery pod, which borrows key elements from the Lazarus Pit. Damian tells the group that he was overthrown by one of Ra's al Ghul's top lieutenants, Zeh-Ro a.k.a. Mr. Zero, who led the League of Assassins to rebel against him and plans on creating a second Ice Age that will leave Earth devoid of life while they take refuge in space for hundreds of years.

Meanwhile, Dick is still at odds with Elainna's decision to become Batwoman, but Barbara convinces him to let his daughter become the woman she wants to be. The three go to the Batcave under Wayne Manor to gain access to a suit that Bruce initially developed for Dick. As the League of Assassins begin to destroy Gotham with their ships to find Damian, Elainna and Dick team up with Terry, Damian, and Goliath to take them out while Bruce destroys their large flying battleship with his satellite. As they regroup, they notice that a large blizzard is forming in Gotham and that the League of Assassins are leaving the Earth in spaceships. Bruce finds out that the League is causing the Earth's temperatures to drop significantly by deploying small satellites from their orbiting platform to form a crystalline barrier that blocks out the sun's rays. The five of them fly to Texas to access one of Bruce's bunkers that contains a spaceship. Dick stays behind to help with the launch as Batman, Batwoman, Damian, and Goliath go into space and board the platform. After dealing with dozens of assassins, Mr. Zero traps the four of them in a room not present in his initial plans and opens the airlock to send them into space, but they manage to stay in by accessing the room's wiring.

On Earth, Bruce, Matt, and Barbara survive the temperature drops, thanks to the Batmobile. Dick gains access to a fleet of Bruce's communication satellites to take out most of the League's satellites with Batwoman as Damian overrides the rest of them. Shortly after Batman defeats Mr. Zero, they escape as the satellite explosions, which blows the platform out of orbit and sends Zeh-Ro and the other assassins drifting into space. As they return to Earth, the world's climate begins to return to normal. Terry convinces Damian to use the League for less destructive means, leading him to revive his partnership with Bruce to combine their resources to improve the world.

Cancelled by Yesterday
After one of Terry's nightly patrols, Bruce suddenly accuses Terry of trying to kill him and activates his defense protocols to attack the McGinnis brothers. Terry is rescued by Booster Gold, who informs him that Bruce has turned against him because of a post-hypnotic suggestion given to him in the past and that Matt was killed by the defense drones. Booster and Skeets take Terry back to the year 2020 on the day where Bruce received the implanted suggestion so they can prevent it from happening. They arrive at a burning neighborhood that is being attacked by the telepathic villain Blanque. As Booster and Blanque fight, Terry rescues a young boy from a burning building who turns out to be his father, Warren McGinnis. He is then suddenly confronted by the younger Bruce as Batman, who believes he is a criminal, but Booster turns his attention towards Blanque so Terry can get Warren to safety.

After Blanque knocks Bruce out, Terry and Booster manage to defeat him with help from Skeets. Before Terry leaves, he has Warren promise to keep his black and red suit a secret. He later returns to his time and is grateful to find that Bruce is seemingly back to normal and Matt is not dead. Once the Mcginnis brothers leave, Bruce meets with an older Booster Gold. It is revealed that the timeline didn't change as Bruce had faked his insanity with Matt so the younger Booster would take Terry back in time to save his father. Warren later wrote in his journal how Batman's heroics inspired him to report Derek Powers to the authorities, which would later result in his death and Terry becoming Batman.

Curtainfall
Terry is informed by Dana that Bruce and Matt were attacked and hospitalized. On his way to the hospital, Batman is pursued by the police. When he arrives, he learns from Barbara and Melanie that Bruce and Matt were attacked in the lab by an imposter Batman, who also killed an airport security guard earlier in the night. Matt arrives at the lobby with a broken arm and tells the group that Bruce had a heart attack during the fight. After patching his relationship with Dana, Terry checks in on Bruce in the emergency room. When he asks Bruce who attacked them, Bruce knocks over a glass of water. Terry is then suddenly approached by Wonder Woman, who offers to help him track down the imposter.

Based on the location of the attacks and Bruce's clue, Terry and Diana deduce that the culprit is Inque and track her down to her next target, Waynetech's Research and Development. Inque is dying and has stolen a stabilizer cube and power source in a desperate attempt to save herself. Batman manages to disperse her solid form with sonics before capturing her body with the stabilizer cube so that they can keep her alive as they try to find a way to cure her. Bruce survives Inque's assault thanks to a successful heart transplant surgery, and the volume ends with Wonder Woman offering Terry a spot on the Justice League.

Batman Beyond: Neo Year series (2022)
In September 2021, it was revealed that a new series would follow Terry McGinnis as he navigates being Batman without the guidance of the recently deceased Bruce Wayne.

Collected editions
Numerous miniseries have been reprinted under the same title as collections. This section lists only reprints from ongoing series. All were issued in trade paperback format unless noted otherwise.

References

External links
DC page: BB2010, BB2011, BB2015, BB2016, BBU2012, BBU2013, BBN-Y2022, SB2011

Comics
Works based on the DC Animated Universe
Batman storylines
Comics based on television series
Cyberpunk comics
Works set in the future
Comics by Christos Gage
Comics by Dan Jurgens